Isotope analysis is the identification of isotopic signature, abundance of certain stable isotopes of chemical elements within organic and inorganic compounds. Isotopic analysis can be used to understand the flow of energy through a food web, to reconstruct past environmental and climatic conditions, to investigate human and animal diets, for food authentification, and a variety of other physical, geological, palaeontological and chemical processes. Stable isotope ratios are measured using mass spectrometry, which separates the different isotopes of an element on the basis of their mass-to-charge ratio.

Tissues affected

Isotopic oxygen is incorporated into the body primarily through ingestion at which point it is used in the formation of, for archaeological purposes, bones and teeth. The oxygen is incorporated into the hydroxylcarbonic apatite of bone and tooth enamel.

Bone is continually remodelled throughout the lifetime of an individual. Although the rate of turnover of isotopic oxygen in hydroxyapatite is not fully known, it is assumed to be similar to that of collagen; approximately 10 years. Consequently, should an individual remain in a region for 10 years or longer, the isotopic oxygen ratios in the bone hydroxyapatite would reflect the oxygen ratios present in that region.

Teeth are not subject to continual remodelling and so their isotopic oxygen ratios remain constant from the time of formation. The isotopic oxygen ratios, then, of teeth represent the ratios of the region in which the individual was born and raised. Where deciduous teeth are present, it is also possible to determine the age at which a child was weaned. Breast milk production draws upon the body water of the mother, which has higher levels of 18O due to the preferential loss of 16O through sweat, urine, and expired water vapour.

While teeth are more resistant to chemical and physical changes over time, both are subject to post-depositional diagenesis. As such, isotopic analysis makes use of the more resistant phosphate groups, rather than the less abundant hydroxyl group or the more likely diagenetic carbonate groups present.

Applications 

Isotope analysis has widespread applicability in the natural sciences. These include numerous applications in the biological, earth and environmental sciences.

Archaeology

Reconstructing ancient diets 

Archaeological materials, such as bone, organic residues, hair, or sea shells, can serve as substrates for isotopic analysis. Carbon, nitrogen and zinc isotope ratios are used to investigate the diets of past people; these isotopic systems can be used with others, such as strontium or oxygen, to answer questions about population movements and cultural interactions, such as trade.

Carbon isotopes are analysed in archaeology to determine the source of carbon at the base of the foodchain. Examining the 12C/13C isotope ratio, it is possible to determine whether animals and humans ate predominantly C3 or C4 plants. Potential C3 food sources include wheat, rice, tubers, fruits, nuts and many vegetables, while C4 food sources include millet and sugar cane. Carbon isotope ratios can also be used to distinguish between marine, freshwater, and terrestrial food sources.

Carbon isotope ratios can be measured in bone collagen or bone mineral (hydroxylapatite), and each of these fractions of bone can be analysed to shed light on different components of diet. The carbon in bone collagen is predominantly sourced from dietary protein, while the carbon found in bone mineral is sourced from all consumed dietary carbon, included carbohydrates, lipids, and protein.

Nitrogen isotopes can be used to infer soil conditions, with enriched δ15N used to infer the addition of manure. A complication is that enrichment also occurs as a result of environmental factors, such as wetland denitrification, salinity, aridity, microbes, and clearance.

To obtain an accurate picture of palaeodiets, it is important to understand processes of diagenesis that may affect the original isotopic signal. It is also important for the researcher to know the variations of isotopes within individuals, between individuals, and over time.

Sourcing archaeological materials 

Isotope analysis has been particularly useful in archaeology as a means of characterization. Characterization of artifacts involves determining the isotopic composition of possible source materials such as metal ore bodies and comparing these data to the isotopic composition of analyzed artifacts. A wide range of archaeological materials such as metals, glass and lead-based pigments have been sourced using isotopic characterization. Particularly in the Bronze Age Mediterranean, lead isotope analysis has been a useful tool for determining the sources of metals and an important indicator of trade patterns. Interpretation of lead isotope data is, however, often contentious and faces numerous instrumental and methodological challenges. Problems such as the mixing and re-using of metals from different sources, limited reliable data and contamination of samples can be difficult problems in interpretation.

Ecology 
All biologically active elements exist in a number of different isotopic forms, of which two or more are stable. For example, most carbon is present as 12C, with approximately 1% being 13C. The ratio of the two isotopes may be altered by biological and geophysical processes, and these differences can be utilized in a number of ways by ecologists. 
The main elements used in isotope ecology are carbon, nitrogen, oxygen, hydrogen and sulfur, but also include silicon, iron, and strontium.

Stable isotope analysis in aquatic ecosystems

Stable isotopes have become a popular method for understanding aquatic ecosystems because they can help scientists in understanding source links and process information in marine food webs. These analyses can also be used to a certain degree in terrestrial systems. Certain isotopes can signify distinct primary producers forming the bases of food webs and trophic level positioning. The stable isotope compositions are expressed in terms of delta values (δ) in permil (‰), i.e. parts per thousand differences from a standard. They express the proportion of an isotope that is in a sample. The values are expressed as:

 δX = [(Rsample / Rstandard) – 1] × 103

where X represents the isotope of interest (e.g., 13C) and R represents the ratio of the isotope of interest and its natural form (e.g., 13C/12C). Higher (or less negative) delta values indicate increases in a sample's isotope of interest, relative to the standard, and lower (or more negative) values indicate decreases. The standard reference materials for carbon, nitrogen, and sulfur are Pee Dee Belamnite limestone, nitrogen gas in the atmosphere, and Cañon Diablo meteorite respectively. Analysis is usually done using a mass spectrometer, detecting small differences between gaseous elements. Analysis of a sample can cost anywhere from $30 to $100. Stable isotopes assist scientists in analyzing animal diets and food webs by examining the animal tissues that bear a fixed isotopic enrichment or depletion vs. the diet. Muscle or protein fractions have become the most common animal tissue used to examine the isotopes because they represent the assimilated nutrients in their diet. The main advantage to using stable isotope analysis as opposed to stomach content observations is that no matter what the status is of the animal's stomach (empty or not), the isotope tracers in the tissues will give us an understanding of its trophic position and food source. The three major isotopes used in aquatic ecosystem food web analysis are 13C, 15N and 34S. While all three indicate information on trophic dynamics, it is common to perform analysis on at least two of the previously mentioned 3 isotopes for better understanding of marine trophic interactions and for stronger results.

Hydrogen-2

The ratio of 2H, also known as deuterium, to 1H has been studied in both plant and animal tissue. Hydrogen isotopes in plant tissue are correlated with local water values but vary based on fractionation during photosynthesis, transpiration, and other processes in the formation of cellulose. A study on the isotope ratios of tissues from plants growing within a small area in Texas found tissues from CAM plants were enriched in deuterium relative to C4 plants. Hydrogen isotope ratios in animal tissue reflect diet, including drinking water, and have been used to study bird migration and aquatic food webs.

Carbon-13

Carbon isotopes aid us in determining the primary production source responsible for the energy flow in an ecosystem. The transfer of 13C through trophic levels remains relatively the same, except for a small increase (an enrichment < 1 ‰). Large differences of δ13C between animals indicate that they have different food sources or that their food webs are based on different primary producers (i.e. different species of phytoplankton, marsh grasses.) Because δ13C indicates the original source of primary producers, the isotopes can also help us determine shifts in diets, both short term, long term or permanent. These shifts may even correlate to seasonal changes, reflecting phytoplankton abundance. Scientists have found that there can be wide ranges of δ13C values in phytoplankton populations over a geographic region. While it is not quite certain as to why this may be, there are several hypotheses for this occurrence. These include isotopes within dissolved inorganic carbon pools (DIC) may vary with temperature and location and that growth rates of phytoplankton may affect their uptake of the isotopes. δ13C has been used in determining migration of juvenile animals from sheltered inshore areas to offshore locations by examining the changes in their diets. A study by Fry (1983) studied the isotopic compositions in juvenile shrimp of south Texas grass flats. Fry found that at the beginning of the study the shrimp had isotopic values of δ13C = -11 to -14‰ and 6-8‰ for δ15N and δ34S. As the shrimp matured and migrated offshore, the isotopic values changed to those resembling offshore organisms (δ13C=  -15‰ and δ15N = 11.5‰ and δ34S = 16‰).

Sulfur-34

While there is no enrichment of 34S between trophic levels, the stable isotope can be useful in distinguishing benthic vs. pelagic producers and marsh vs. phytoplankton producers. Similar to 13C, it can also help distinguish between different phytoplankton as the key primary producers in food webs. The differences between seawater sulfates and sulfides (c. 21‰ vs -10‰) aid scientists in the discriminations. Sulfur tends to be more plentiful in less aerobic areas, such as benthic systems and marsh plants, than the pelagic and more aerobic systems. Thus, in the benthic systems, there are smaller δ34S values.

Nitrogen-15

Nitrogen isotopes indicate the trophic level position of organisms (reflective of the time the tissue samples were taken). There is a larger enrichment component with δ15N because its retention is higher than that of 14N. This can be seen by analyzing the waste of organisms. Cattle urine has shown that there is a depletion of 15N relative to the diet. As organisms eat each other, the 15N isotopes are transferred to the predators. Thus, organisms higher in the trophic pyramid have accumulated higher levels of 15N ( and higher δ15N values) relative to their prey and others before them in the food web. Numerous studies on marine ecosystems have shown that on average there is a 3.2‰ enrichment of 15N vs. diet between different trophic level species in ecosystems. In the Baltic sea, Hansson et al. (1997) found that when analyzing a variety of creatures (such as particulate organic matter (phytoplankton), zooplankton, mysids, sprat, smelt and herring,) there was an apparent fractionation of 2.4‰ between consumers and their apparent prey.

In addition to trophic positioning of organisms, δ15N values have become commonly used in distinguishing between land derived and natural sources of nutrients. As water travels from septic tanks to aquifers, the nitrogen rich water is delivered into coastal areas. Waste-water nitrate has higher concentrations of 15N than the nitrate that is found in natural soils in near shore zones. For bacteria, it is more convenient for them to uptake 14N as opposed to 15N because it is a lighter element and easier to metabolize. Thus, due to bacteria's preference when performing biogeochemical processes such as denitrification and volatilization of ammonia, 14N is removed from the water at a faster rate than 15N, resulting in more 15N entering the aquifer. 15N is roughly 10-20‰ as opposed to the natural 15N values of 2-8‰. The inorganic nitrogen that is emitted from septic tanks and other human-derived sewage is usually in the form of NH4+. Once the nitrogen enters the estuaries via groundwater, it is thought that because there is more 15N entering, that there will also be more 15N in the inorganic nitrogen pool delivered and that it is picked up more by producers taking up N. Even though 14N is easier to take up, because there is much more 15N, there will still be higher amounts assimilated than normal. These levels of δ15N can be examined in creatures that live in the area and are non migratory (such as macrophytes, clams and even some fish). This method of identifying high levels of nitrogen input is becoming a more and more popular method in attempting to monitor nutrient input into estuaries and coastal ecosystems. Environmental managers have become more and more concerned about measuring anthropogenic nutrient inputs into estuaries because excess in nutrients can lead to eutrophication and hypoxic events, eliminating organisms from an area entirely.

Oxygen-18

Analysis of the ratio of 18O to 16O in the shells of the Colorado Delta clam was used to assess the historical extent of the estuary in the Colorado River Delta prior to construction of upstream dams.

Forensic science 

A recent development in forensic science is the isotopic analysis of hair strands. Hair has a recognisable growth rate of 9-11mm per month or 15 cm per year. Human hair growth is primarily a function of diet, especially drinking water intake. The stable isotopic ratios of drinking water are a function of location, and the geology that the water percolates through. 87Sr, 88Sr and oxygen isotope variations are different all over the world. These differences in isotopic ratio are then biologically 'set' in our hair as it grows and it has therefore become possible to identify recent geographic histories by the analysis of hair strands. For example, it could be possible to identify whether a terrorist suspect had recently been to a particular location from hair analysis. This hair analysis is a non-invasive method which is becoming very popular in cases that DNA or other traditional means are bringing no answers.

Isotope analysis can be used by forensic investigators to determine whether two or more samples of explosives are of a common origin. Most high explosives contain carbon, hydrogen, nitrogen and oxygen atoms and thus comparing their relative abundances of isotopes can reveal the existence of a common origin. Researchers have also shown that analysis of the 12C/13C ratios can locate the country of origin for a given explosive.

Stable isotopic analysis has also been used in the identification of drug trafficking routes. Isotopic abundances are different in morphine grown from poppies in south-east Asia versus poppies grown in south-west Asia. The same is applied to cocaine that is derived from Bolivia and that from Colombia.

Traceability 

Stable isotopic analysis has also been used for tracing the geographical origin of food, timber, and in tracing the sources and fates of nitrates in the environment.

Geology

Hydrology 
In isotope hydrology, stable isotopes of water (2H and 18O) are used to estimate the source, age, and flow paths of water flowing through ecosystems. The main effects that change the stable isotope composition of water are evaporation and condensation. Variability in water isotopes is used to study sources of water to streams and rivers, evaporation rates, groundwater recharge, and other hydrological processes.

Paleoclimatology 
The ratio of 18O to 16O in ice and deep sea cores is temperature dependent, and can be used as a proxy measure for reconstructing climate change. During colder periods of the Earth's history (glacials) such as during the ice ages, 16O is preferentially evaporated from the colder oceans, leaving the slightly heavier and more sluggish 18O behind. Organisms such as foraminifera which combine oxygen dissolved in the surrounding water with carbon and calcium to build their shells therefore incorporate the temperature-dependent 18O to 16O ratio. When these organisms die, they settle out on the sea bed, preserving a long and invaluable record of global climate change through much of the Quaternary. Similarly, ice cores on land are enriched in the heavier 18O relative to 16O during warmer climatic phases (interglacials) as more energy is available for the evaporation of the heavier 18O isotope. The oxygen isotope record preserved in the ice cores is therefore a "mirror" of the record contained in ocean sediments.

Oxygen isotopes preserve a record of the effects of the Milankovitch cycles on climate change during the Quaternary, revealing an approximately 100,000-year cyclicity in the Earth's climate.

References

External links 
 MixSIAR. MixSIAR is an R package that helps you create and run Bayesian mixing models to analyze biotracer data (i.e. stable isotopes, fatty acids), following the MixSIAR model framework. Both graphical user interface (GUI) and script versions are available. Stock, B.C., Jackson, A.L., Ward, E.J., Parnell, A.C., Phillips, D.L., Semmens, B.X. Associated peer-reviewed research paper.
 IsoSource. Stable isotope mixing model for an excess number of sources (Visual Basic), (Phillips and Gregg, 2003).

 SIAR - Stable isotope analysis in R.. Bayesian mixing model package for the R environment. Parnell, A., Inger, R., Bearhop, S., Jackson, A.
 SISUS: Stable Isotope Sourcing using Sampling. Stable Isotope Sourcing using Sampling (SISUS) (Erhardt, Wolf, and Bedrick, In Prep.) provides a more efficient algorithm to provide solutions to the same problem as the Phillips and Gregg (2003) IsoSource model and software for source partitioning using stable isotopes.

Isotopes